Lez Bomb is a 2018 American comedy-drama film written by, directed by and starring Jenna Laurenzo.  Bobby Farrelly served as an executive producer of the film.

Plot

Lauren is a young woman living in Jersey City who travels back to her hometown of Ramsey, New Jersey for the Thanksgiving holiday. Lauren has a secret: she is a closeted lesbian who has not yet come out to her dysfunctional and conservative family, finally deciding to do so by inviting her lover, Hailey, over to meet at her parents' house. However, things take a turn when Lauren's male roommate, Austin, shows up and Lauren's parents mistake him for her boyfriend. That leads Lauren to persuade Austin to go along with the charade until she has the courage to tell her family the truth about who she is.

Cast
Jenna Laurenzo as Lauren
Caitlin Mehner as Hailey
Brandon Micheal Hall as Austin
Steve Guttenberg as Mike
Elaine Hendrix as Maggie
Dierdre O'Connell as Rose
Rob Moran as Ken
Davram Stiefler as John
Bruce Dern as Grandpa
Kevin Pollak as George
Cloris Leachman as Josephine
 A.B. Cassidy as Emma
 Jordyn DiNatale as Jessica

Reception
The film has  rating on Rotten Tomatoes.

Accolade
The film won the Jury Award for Narrative Feature at the Bentonville Film Festival.

References

External links
 
 

American comedy-drama films
American LGBT-related films
LGBT-related comedy-drama films
2018 films
2010s English-language films
2018 LGBT-related films
2010s American films